Anna Madeley (born 1 October 1976) is an English actress. She performed for three seasons with the Royal Shakespeare Company and has appeared in three off-West End productions. She has starred in productions on each of the main British television channels and has also worked in radio and film. Madeley has appeared as Kate Kendrick in Deadwater Fell and as Audrey Hall in the remake of All Creatures Great and Small.

Early life and education
Madeley grew up in London, attending North London Collegiate School. Her speech teacher set her up with some auditions, and she began her career as a child actress at age seven. She then trained at the Central School of Speech and Drama.

Career 
She performed with the Royal Shakespeare Company in its 2001–2002 and 2003–2004 seasons. She appeared in The Roman Actor opposite Sir Antony Sher. From 2003 to 2005, she was a regular cast member of ITV's The Royal in which she played Nurse Samantha Beaumont.

In 2005, Madeley appeared in three off-West End productions (Laura Wade's Colder Than Here, as well as The Philanthropist and The Cosmonaut's Last Message..., both at the Donmar Warehouse), and rounded off the year starring as both Aaron and Young Alexander Ashbrook in the original Royal National Theatre production of Helen Edmundson's Coram Boy. In 2006, she starred in two BBC TV films – as the title character in The Secret Life of Mrs Beeton, and in the original drama Aftersun – and the high-profile ITV drama The Outsiders. In early 2007 she was a central character in the first episode of “Lewis”, and she also appeared in Channel 4's Consent, which combined a dramatised vignette about an alleged date rape with a "real life" sequence in which lawyers and a jury made up of members of the public participated in a trial. In February 2007, she played Nina in a production of The Seagull as an understudy when the original actress fell ill. Madeley was the only cast member to reprise her role in Grindley's 2009 Broadway production of The Philanthropist.

In 2010, Madeley appeared in The Secret Diaries of Miss Anne Lister, based on a script by Jane English, and starring Maxine Peake as Anne Lister, a 19th-century industrialist who was Britain's "first modern lesbian" and who kept a detailed journal. The film was shown on the opening night at the Frameline Film Festival at the Castro Theatre in San Francisco in June 2010. In January 2013, Madeley starred in Hammer Films' first live theatre play, a new stage adaptation of The Turn of the Screw. In 2016, she played the role of Clarissa Eden in the Netflix series The Crown. In 2018, she played the role of Marie Stahlbaum, the late mother to the protagonist, Clara, and the queen of the magical land Clara discovers in the fantasy/adventure film The Nutcracker and the Four Realms. In 2020, she played Kate Kendrick in Deadwater Fell and was cast as housekeeper Audrey Hall in the remake of All Creatures Great and Small.

Selected credits

Filmography

Stage
 The Merry Wives of Windsor (1986, RSC)
 Be My Baby (1998, Pleasance Theatre)
 Sense & Sensibility (2000, UK tour)
 Eye Contact (2000, Riverside Studios)
 Madness In Valencia (2001, RSC) as Erifila
 Love in a Wood (2001, RSC) as Martha
 A Russian In The Woods (2001, RSC) as Ilse
 The Malcontent (RSC) as Maria
 The Roman Actor (RSC) as Domita
 Ladybird (2004, Royal Court Theatre) as Yulka
 The Rivals (2004, Bristol Old Vic) as Lydia Languish
 Colder Than Here (2005, Soho Theatre) as Jenna
 The Cosmonaut's Last Message to the Woman He Once Loved in the Former Soviet Union (2005, Donmar Warehouse) as Nastasja/Claire
 The Philanthropist (2005, Donmar Warehouse) as Celia
 Coram Boy (2005–06, Royal National Theatre) as Aaron / Young Alexander Ashbrook
 Contractions (2008, Royal Court Theatre) as Emma
 Earthquakes in London (2010, Cottesloe Theatre at the National Theatre) as Freya
 Becky Shaw (2011, Almeida Theatre) as Suzanna
 The Turn of the Screw (2013, Almeida Theatre) as the Governess
 The Crucible (2014, The Old Vic Theatre) as Elizabeth Proctor
 Les Blancs (2016, National Theatre) as Dr. Marta Gotterling
 The Height of the Storm (2018, Richmond Theatre)

Radio
 Shadows in Bronze (2005, radio series) as Helena Justina
 Venus in Copper (2006, radio series) as Helena
 The Iron Hand of Mars (2007, radio series) as Helena
 Poseidon's Gold (2009, radio series) as Helena
 Hammer Horror's The Unquenchable Thirst of Dracula (2017) as Penny Woods

References

External links

1976 births
20th-century English actresses
21st-century English actresses
Actresses from London
Alumni of the Royal Central School of Speech and Drama
English Shakespearean actresses
English child actresses
English film actresses
English radio actresses
English stage actresses
English television actresses
Living people
People educated at North London Collegiate School
Royal Shakespeare Company members